This article summarizes healthcare in California.

California State Department of Health Care Services

The California Department of Health manages state government projects in California.

Health insurance 
As of 2018, most of the insured in California were in plans regulated by the California Department of Managed Health Care (DMHC) with about 60% regulated by either DMHC or the California Department of Insurance (CDI). This dual regulation arose due for historical reasons, and when the DMHC was created in 2000, the California legislature requested a report on merging the health insurer responsibilities with the CDI. Dual regulation has also raised questions around the applicability of premium tax to the DHMC-regulated entities, which have historically not paid premium taxes while CDI-regulated entities have. Value-based pay for performance managed care plans where providers take on risk have arisen, and in 2019 the DHMC announced plans to regulate these "risk-bearing entities".

Medi-Cal 
As of 2018, about one-third of California was covered by Medi-Cal, which is California's Medicaid program. It is administered by the California Department of Health Care Services, which operates it in accordance with California's Medicaid State Plan and Title XIX of the Social Security Act.

Private markets 
As of 2015, about 14.1 million people were insured privately, including in self-funded plans; 1.3 million were in plans regulated by the CDI and 12.7 million were in plans regulated by the DHMC. Kaiser Permanente had about 50% of the market, followed by Blue Shield of California, Anthem Blue Cross, and Health Net (a subsidiary of Centene).

L.A. Care was among the top six in 2015, and the largest county-based insurer. As of 2017, UnitedHealthcare was sixth-largest.

Marketplace 
Covered California is the health insurance marketplace.

Kaiser Permanente and Blue Shield of California had about two-thirds of the market share as of 2018. In 2017 Anthem stopped selling on the exchange.

Healthcare by region

Los Angeles

Los Angeles offers all available health care services. Notable health systems or hospitals in the region include Los Angeles County Department of Health Services, Kaiser Permanente, UCLA Health, Cedars-Sinai, Verity Health, Providence Health, UCI Medical Center, and Keck Hospital of USC.

San Francisco Bay Area

San Francisco offers all available health care services. Large health systems in Northern California include Sutter Health, Kaiser Permanente, UCSF Health, Dignity Health, and Stanford Medical.

In 2018, a lawsuit was filed against Sutter Health for alleged antitrust.

Infrastructure

Health care districts in California

Proposed single-payer healthcare
A single-payer health care system for California has been suggested multiple times. Two bills in the California State Legislature that would have implemented universal health coverage were vetoed by Governor Arnold Schwarzenegger in 2006 and 2008, respectively. A new 2021 proposal for single-payer healthcare, AB 1400, is being presented in the State Assembly, and has renewed discussion about unilateral state-wide universal healthcare.  On January 31, 2022 the bill was shelved and not voted on by the assembly.

Outbreaks, plagues, and epidemics
COVID-19 pandemic in California

See also
California Medical Association
California Health and Safety Code 
California Senate Bill 277 removed personal belief as exemption from vaccination requirements for entry to schools

References

External links
California Department of Health Care Services
California Department of Public Health

The California Health Care Landscape

 
History of medicine in California